The  (Tyrolean Mountain Guards) is a public corporation, and is based in Innsbruck, Tyrol. The Tyrolean Mountain Guards is thus one of nine mountain and nature conservation organisations in Austria.

History
The first Tyrolean Mountain Guards Act came into force on 31 October 1927. The tasks of the mountain guards under this law were "The protection of persons and property in field, alp and forest property, alpine shelters, their equipment and accessories and the maintenance of contamination or disfigurement of the area by tossing and dropping objects, especially so far the danger, injury or pollution is related to a sporting activity or excursion traffic ".

In 1938, the mountain guards were made subordinate to the gendarmerie as an auxiliary police force. The duties remained the same as before the merge. While Austria was annexed by the Nazis the nature reserves in Tyrol were greatly expanded, with the mountain guards continuing in their role of enforcing conservation laws.

In 1978 the new Tyrolean Mountain Guard Act 1977 came into force. The mountain guards were merged into a body of public law enforcement, providing more powers to guards to great regulatory oversight. The exercise of mountain rescue services was regulated, but continued not to be a core focus.

In 2002 an amended version of the Tyrolean Mountain Guard Act 1977 was passed. It was the first time mountain rescue services were outlined in the Mountain Guard Act. In 2007, the Tyrolean mountain rescue service stations were also equipped with digital radio systems, which has allowed statewide communication.

Task Area
The members of the Tiroler Bergwacht are sworn in officers of public supervision and supervise as auxiliary officers of the district administrative authorities in the designated area of activity according to mountain guard law §1:
Tyrolean nature conservation law with associated regulations
Tyrolean National Park Law Hohe Tauern
Tyrolean Waste Management Act
 Noise protection, protection against endangering and harassment by animals
Tyrolean field protection law
Tyrolean camping law

Uniform
The  precisely regulates the appearance of the mountain guard. The uniforms are sourced from the clothing management fund of the B.M.I. In the long term, this enables the most economical efficient procurement of service clothing. For all weather conditions, there are various outer clothing and jacket options (multipurpose jackets, fleeces, and fleece jackets). Furthermore, mountain guards are provided short- and long-sleeved shirts, a rock-grey alpine trousers, and a baseball cap and beret headgear. The position of a mountain guard is recognisable by the rank slides worn.

Powers
The supervisory organisations of the Tiroler Bergwacht gave the Bergwacht special powers to enforce the law of the Tyrol Landtag. Mountain guards are allowed to enforce these state laws:
Stop people and vehicles and ask for proof of identity.
Issue warnings or report violations to the district administrative board (at the discretion of the incoming supervisory board).
In special cases, arrest people and present them to the district administration.
Confiscate objects that being in possession of such constitute an offense.
Specially trained mountain guards may collect fines.

Ranks

See also
 Bergwacht
 Forest Ranger
 Law enforcement in Austria
 Mountain Rescue
 Park Ranger
 Swiss Alpine Club

References

External links
Tyrolean Mountain Guards official website
Current Rank Insignia
Former Rank Insignia

1927 establishments in Austria
Organizations established in 1927
Nature conservation in Austria
Environment and heritage law enforcement agencies
Law enforcement in Austria
Law enforcement agencies of Austria
Mountain rescue
Organisations based in Innsbruck